Shikara, Shikhara, and other variants can refer to one of the following:

 Shikara, a type of wooden ship found on Dal Lake
 Shikhara, the rising roof of a Hindu temple in North India
 Shikra, a bird of prey also known as the little banded goshawk
 Sikra, a village in Bhachau Taluka of Kutch district of Gujarat, India.

Films
 Shikar (1968 film), a Bollywood film 
 Shikhar (2005 film), a Bollywood drama film
 Shikara (2020 film), a Bollywood romantic comedy film

Other uses 

 Code Shikara, a computer worm, related to the Dorkbot family

See also